Farmborough  is a small village and civil parish,  south west of Bath in Somerset, England. It straddles both the A39 and A368 roads. The parish has a population of 1,035.

History 

The Farmborough Hoard of Iron Age coins was found in the village in 1984 and is now in the British Museum.
 
The parish of Farmborough was part of the Keynsham Hundred, The village has historically been connected with the coal mines of the Somerset coalfield, but these are all now closed.

Farmborough Church of England VC Primary School was built in 1857, and now has 90 pupils between the ages of 4 and 11 years. The school intake figures have shown a gradual decline in attendance in recent years. In 2007 the local community pre-school playgroup moved into an unused classroom at the school site and a breakfast club was established to assist working parents to leave their children in a safe environment prior to school opening hours.
Author Dick King-Smith once taught at the school.

Governance 

The parish council has responsibility for local issues, including setting an annual precept (local rate) to cover the council’s operating costs and producing annual accounts for public scrutiny. The parish council evaluates local planning applications and works with the local police, district council officers, and neighbourhood watch groups on matters of crime, security, and traffic. The parish council's role also includes initiating projects for the maintenance and repair of parish facilities, such as the village hall or community centre, playing fields and playgrounds, as well as consulting with the district council on the maintenance, repair, and improvement of highways, drainage, footpaths, public transport, and street cleaning. Conservation matters (including trees and listed buildings) and environmental issues are also of interest to the council.

The Farmborough ward is represented by one councillor on the unitary authority of Bath and North East Somerset which was created in 1996, as established by the Local Government Act 1992. It provides a single tier of local government with responsibility for almost all local government functions within its area including local planning and building control, local roads, council housing, environmental health, markets and fairs, refuse collection, recycling, cemeteries, crematoria, leisure services, parks, and tourism. It is also responsible for education, social services, libraries, main roads, public transport, trading standards, waste disposal and strategic planning, although fire, police and ambulance services are provided jointly with other authorities through the Avon Fire and Rescue Service, Avon and Somerset Constabulary and the Great Western Ambulance Service.

Bath and North East Somerset's area covers part of the ceremonial county of Somerset but it is administered independently of the non-metropolitan county. Its administrative headquarters is in Bath. Between 1 April 1974 and 1 April 1996, it was the Wansdyke district and the City of Bath of the county of Avon.

An electoral ward with the same name exists. Although Farmborough is the most populous area of the ward this stretches north almost to Keynsham. The total population of the ward as at the 2011 census was 2,505.

The parish is represented in the House of Commons of the Parliament of the United Kingdom as part of North East Somerset. It elects one Member of Parliament (MP) by the first past the post system of election. Prior to Brexit in 2020, it was part of the South West England constituency of the European Parliament which elected seven MEPs using the d'Hondt method of party-list proportional representation.

Demographics 

According to the 2001 census the Farmborough ward (which includes Compton Dando, Marksbury, Woollard and Chewton Keynsham), had 1,111 residents, living in 428 households, with an average age of 44.5 years. Of these, 71% of residents described their health as 'good', 21% of 16- to 74-year-olds had no qualifications, and the area had an unemployment rate of 1.0% of all economically active people aged 16–74. In the Index of Multiple Deprivation 2004, it was ranked at 22,100 out of 32,482 wards in England, where 1 was the most deprived LSOA and 32,482 the least deprived.

Church 

The Church of All Saints dates from the 15th century and is a Grade II* listed building.

In the 13th century John Stafford who later became the Archbishop of Canterbury was the rector of Farmborough.

Notable residents 
 Anthony Head, actor
 Author Dick King-Smith, author of Foxbusters; The Sheep Pig, which was made into the film Babe (early 1970s - 80s?); while writing but before his books became famous he was a much-loved teacher at Farmborough Primary School
 Charles Warrell, creator of the I-Spy children's books; born in Farmborough in 1889

References

External links 

Map of Farmborough circa 1900

Farmborough Life - The community website for Farmborough village

Somerset coalfield
Civil parishes in Somerset
Villages in Bath and North East Somerset